Graham Arthur Charlton Bell  (born 1949) is an English academic, writer, and evolutionary biologist with interests in the evolution of sexual reproduction and the maintenance of variation. He developed the "Tangled Bank" theory of evolutionary genetics after observing the asexual and sexual behaviour patterns of aphids as well as monogonont rotifers.

Education and early life
Born on 3 March 1949 in Leicester, England, Bell was educated at Wyggeston Grammar School for Boys and St Peter's College, Oxford, where he was awarded a Bachelor of Arts degree in 1970, a Master of Arts degree in 1971 followed by a Doctor of Philosophy degree in animal ecology in 1973 for research on smooth newts (Triturus vulgaris).

Career and research
Bell emigrated to Canada in 1975 where he worked as a biologist for the Alberta Civil Service until 1976. In 1976, he joined the faculty of McGill University as a temporary lecturer. He was appointed a Professor in 1989. In 1992, he was appointed Molson Chair of Genetics. He was Director of the Redpath Museum from 1995 to 2005.

He is the author of The Masterpiece of Nature which was described by Richard Dawkins as a 'beautifully written tour de force', Sex and Death in Protozoa: The History of Obsession and Selection: The Mechanism of Evolution first published in 1996 with a second edition in 2008. His other books include The Evolution of Life and The Basics of Selection.

Honours and awards
Bell was elected a Fellow of the Royal Society of Canada in 1994. He was awarded the Léo-Pariseau Prize in 2002 and the Prix Marie-Victorin in 2004. He was elected President of the Royal Society of Canada in 2013, and became a fellow of the American Academy of Arts and Sciences in 2014. He was elected a Fellow of the Royal Society in 2016. In 2022 he received the Flavelle Medal.

References

External links
 Faculty page 

1949 births
Living people
People from Leicester
People educated at Wyggeston Grammar School for Boys
Alumni of St Peter's College, Oxford
British evolutionary biologists
Honorary Fellows of St Peter's College, Oxford
Fellows of the Royal Society of Canada
Fellows of the American Academy of Arts and Sciences
Fellows of the Royal Society
Academic staff of McGill University